Gyula Donáth (March 13, 1850 – September 27, 1909), was a Hungarian sculptor.

He was born in Pest and studied in  Vienna with G. Semper. From 1880 onwards he worked in Budapest. His sculptural style integrated elements of classicism and academic as well as the Art Nouveau styles. Much of his output as a sculptor was creating plastic art for tombs, though he also created public monuments for both the Millennium of Hungary (1898) and the Imperial Jubilee, (1908).  It was Donáth who sculpted the "Statue of Werbőczi" (since then demolished).

Donáth's huge bronze Turul on the railing of Buda Castle, high above the Danube, was erected in 1903. It is one of the symbols of Budapest.

The representation of women in Art Nouveau is limited to iconographical types developed from a preoccupation with relatively few themes: the mystery of life and death, the relationship between the sexes, and women as an emblem of whatever was enigmatic or mysteriously attractive.
The author then goes on to include Donáth's opus Song of Lament as an example. (Berend)

Donáth died in Budapest.

Sources & resources
Berend, Ivan T., A Golden Age: Art and Society in Hungary  1896 - 1914, Corvina/Barbican Art Gallery, Miami, Florida  1990
Mackay, James, The Dictionary of Sculptors in Bronze, Antique Collectors Club,  Woodbridge, Suffolk  1977

Hungarian sculptors
1850 births
1909 deaths
Art Nouveau sculptors
People from Pest, Hungary